The Revised Penal Code contains the general penal laws of the Philippines. First enacted in 1930, it remains in effect today, despite several amendments thereto. It does not comprise a comprehensive compendium of all Philippine penal laws.  The Revised Penal Code itself was enacted as Act No. 3815, and some Philippine criminal laws have been enacted outside of the Revised Penal Code as separate Republic Acts.

Historical background
The Revised Penal Code supplanted the 1870 Spanish Código Penal, which was in force in the Philippines (then a colony of the Spanish Empire up to 1898) from 1886 to 1930, after a failed attempt in to be implemented in 1877. The new Code was drafted by a committee created in 1927, and headed by Judge Anacleto Díaz, who would later serve on the Supreme Court. Rather than engage in a wholesale codification of all penal laws in the Philippines, the committee instead revised the old Penal Code and included all other penal laws only insofar as they related to the Penal Code.

Features

The Revised Penal Code criminalizes a whole class of acts that are generally accepted as criminal, such as the taking of a life whether through murder or homicide, rape, robbery and theft, and treason. The Code also penalizes other acts which are considered criminal in the Philippines, such as adultery, concubinage, and abortion. It expressly defines the elements that each crime comprises, and the existence of all these elements have to be proven beyond reasonable doubt in order to secure conviction.

Not all crimes in the Philippines are penalized under the Code; certain crimes, such as the illegal possession of firearms, are penalized under special legislation contained in Republic Acts. The most notable crimes now excluded from the Revised Penal Code are those concerning illegal drug use or trafficking, which are penalized instead under the Dangerous Drugs Act of 1972 and later the Comprehensive Dangerous Drugs Act of 2002.

One distinct aspect of the Revised Penal Code centers on its classification of aggravating, exempting and mitigating circumstances, the appreciation of which affects the gradation of penalties. Penalties under the Revised Penal Code are generally divided into three periods – the minimum period, the medium period, and the maximum period. In addition to establishing the elements of the crime, the prosecution may also establish the presence of aggravating circumstances in order to set the penalty at the maximum period, or mitigating circumstances to reduce the penalty to its minimum period. The presence of both aggravating and mitigating circumstance, or the absence of such circumstances, may result in the imposition of the penalty in its medium period.

Several provisions of the Revised Penal Code have also been amended through Republic Acts.  One of the more consequential amendments came in 1997, with the passage of Republic Act No. 8353, the Anti-Rape Law of 1997. Prior to the 1997 amendments, rape had been classified as a crime against chastity and was defined as "having carnal knowledge of a woman" under enumerated circumstances that indicated lack of consent. Under the amendments, rape was reclassified as a crime against persons. The definition was further expanded from mere "carnal knowledge of a woman" and now included "an act of sexual assault by inserting his penis into other person's mouth or anal orifice, or any instrument or object, into the genital or anal orifice of another person." Additional circumstances by which the victim would be deemed incapable of giving valid consent were also integrated into this new definition of rape.

With the abolition of the death penalty in 2006, the highest penalty currently possible under the Revised Penal Code is reclusión perpetua, which ranges from 20 years and 1 day to 40 years' imprisonment.  The penalty of life imprisonment is not provided for in the Revised Penal Code, although it is imposed by other penal statutes such as the Comprehensive Dangerous Drugs Act.

Republic Act 10951, signed by president Rodrigo Duterte in 2017, updated the fines and penalties to the law. Previously, the law mandated fines ranging from five to 100,000 pesos; the new law updated the fines, ranging from 1,000 pesos for other coercions and unjust vexations, up to 4 million for treason. The law also amends the length of incarceration for malversation of public funds.

Preliminary article 
It states that the law shall be known as the "Revised Penal Code."

Book One 
A preliminary article states when it takes effect (on January 1, 1932), and where the law can be enforced, which includes the Philippine archipelago, and on a Philippine ship or airship, among others.

Title One: Felonies and criminal liability 
Chapter One defines what a felony is, which are acts and omissions punishable by law, either by means of deceit, or by fault. If defines who is criminally liable, whether a felony is consummated, frustrated or attempted, when conspiracy and proposal to commit felonies are punishable, which felonies are light, less grave and grave.

The succeeding chapters list which circumstances justify, exempt, mitigate and aggravate criminal liability.

Title Two: Persons criminally liable 
This title discusses who are the persons liable. These include the principals, accomplices and the accessories, with the latter classification not used for light felonies.

Title Three: Penalties
All penalties relating to death are commuted to reclusión perpetua.

Length of incarceration

Other penalties 
 Public censure (also a light penalty)
 Fines (also an afflictive penalty)
Civil interdiction: Deprive the offender during the time of his sentence of the rights of parental authority, or guardianship

Accessory penalties 

 Perpetual or temporary absolute disqualification
 The deprivation of the public offices and employments which the offender may have held even if conferred by popular election.
 The deprivation of the right to vote in any election for any popular elective office or to be elected to such office, and the disqualification for the offices or public employments and for the exercise of any of the rights mentioned.
 In case of temporary disqualification, this deprivation and disqualification shall last during the term of the sentence.
 The loss of all rights to retirement pay or other pension for any office formerly held.
 Perpetual or temporary special disqualification:
 The deprivation of the office, employment, profession or calling affected;
 The disqualification for holding similar offices or employments either perpetually or during the term of the sentence according to the extent of such disqualification.
 Perpetual or temporary special disqualification for the exercise of the right of suffrage
 Deprive the offender perpetually or during the term of the sentence, according to the nature of said penalty, of the right to vote in any popular election for any public office or to be elected to such office. Moreover, the offender shall not be permitted to hold any public office during the period of his disqualification.
 Suspension from any public office, profession or calling, or the right of suffrage
 Disqualify the offender from holding such office or exercising such profession or calling or right of suffrage during the term of the sentence

Title Four: Extinction of criminal liability and civil liability

Extinction of criminal liability 
This discusses when criminal liability is extinguished. These include by death of the convict, service of the sentence, by amnesty, and by absolute pardon, among others.

Prescription of crimes 
This discusses when crimes can no longer be prosecuted, from the time the crime is discovered by the offended party, the authorities, or their agents.

Title Five: Civil liability 
The law states that "every person criminally liable for a felony is also civilly liable."

Book Two 
The code classifies crimes into different titles, each divided to one or more chapters, all of these in Book Two of the code.

Title One: Crimes against national security and the law of nations

Title Two: Crimes against the fundamental laws of the state

Title Three: Crimes against public order

Title Four: Crimes against public interest

Title Five: Crimes relative to opium and other prohibited drugs 
Repealed by Comprehensive Dangerous Drugs Act of 2002.

Title Six: Crimes against public morals 

Articles 195 to 199, which cover gambling, have been repealed by Presidential Decree 1602 as amended by Republic Act 9287.

Title Seven: Crimes committed by public officers 
For purposes of this section, and elsewhere when cited, a public officer is a anyone who takes part in public functions of the government of the Philippines.

Other crimes committed by public officers are included in the Anti-Graft and Corrupt Practices Act, and other laws.

Title Eight: Crimes against persons

Title Nine: Crimes against personal liberty and security

Title Ten: Crimes against property

Title Eleven: Crimes against chastity

Title Twelve: Crimes against civil status of persons

Title Thirteen: Crimes against honor

Title Fourteen: Quasi-offenses (criminal negligence)

Title Fifteen: Final provisions 
This includes provisions on crimes committed prior to the code to be applied under the laws at that time, and a repealing clause.

Other penalties 
 Qualified bribery: If any public officer is entrusted with law enforcement and he refrains from arresting or prosecuting an offender who has committed a crime punishable by reclusión perpetua and/or death in consideration of any offer, promise, gift or present, he shall suffer the penalty for the offense which was not prosecuted.
 If it is the public officer who asks or demands such gift or present, he shall suffer the penalty of death.
Corruption of public officials: The same penalties on the person corrupted except those of disqualification and suspension, shall be imposed upon any person who shall have made the offers or promises or given the gifts or presents as described in the preceding articles. (Chapter 2, Section 2.)
Death or physical injuries inflicted under exceptional circumstances
Any legally married person who having surprised his spouse in the act of committing sexual intercourse with another person, shall kill any of them or both of them in the act or immediately thereafter, or shall inflict upon them any serious physical injury, shall suffer the penalty of destierro.
If he shall inflict upon them physical injuries of any other kind, he shall be exempt from punishment.
 Dueling, if causing injury, will be treated as if it's a normal crime (as serious physical injuries or assault)
 Grave threats: The penalty next lower in degree than that prescribed by law for the crime be threatened to commit, if the offender shall not have attained his purpose, the penalty lower by two degrees shall be imposed.

Amendments 
The code has been amended and repealed multiple times:
Commonwealth Act No. 616, criminalized espionage
Republic Act No. 10, criminalized usurpation of public authority
Republic Act No. 1700, outlawed the Communist Party of the Philippines and its successors (later repealed by Republic Act No. 7636)
Republic Act No. 3019, created the Anti-Graft and Corrupt Practices Act
Republic Act No. 4200, criminalized wiretapping

Republic Act No. 6425, criminalized illegal drugs (later amended by Republic Act No. 9165, otherwise known as the Comprehensive Dangerous Drugs Act of 2002)
Republic Act No. 6539, criminalized carnapping (later amended by Republic Act No. 10883, otherwise known as the New Anti-Carnapping Act of 2016)
Presidential Decree No. 90, criminalized rumor-mongering
Presidential Decree No. 449, regulated cockfights
Presidential Decree No. 483, criminalized sports betting, point shaving, match fixing and the like
Presidential Decree No. 519, outlawed pinball machines
Presidential Decree No. 532, criminalized highway robbery
Presidential Decree No. 749, granted immunity to givers of bribes
Presidential Decree No. 818, increased penalties for estafa
Presidential Decree No. 1602, increased penalties for illegal gambling (later amended by Republic Act No. 9287)
Presidential Decree No. 1613, amended the law on arson
Presidential Decree No. 1866, regulated firearms (later amended by Republic Act No. 10591, otherwise known as the Comprehensive Firearms and Ammunition Regulation Act)
Republic Act No. 6968, criminalized coup d'etats
Republic Act No. 8353, amended the law on rape and increased the penalties for it
Republic Act No. 9208, established the Intellectual Property Office
Republic Act No. 9262, criminalized violence against women and their children
Republic Act No. 9287, criminalized human trafficking (later expanded by Republic Act No. 10364, otherwise known as the Expanded Anti-Trafficking in Persons Act of 2012)
Republic Act No. 9372 or the Human Security Act, criminalized terrorism (later amended by Republic Act No. 11479, otherwise known as the "Anti-Terrorism Act of 2020") 
Republic Act No. 9851, criminalized crimes against international humanitarian law, genocide and crimes against humanity
Republic Act No. 10158, decriminalized vagrancy
Republic Act No. 10175, criminalized acts in cyberspace via the Cybercrime Prevention Act of 2012
Republic Act No. 10592, amended the law on increasing the good conduct time allowance for prisoners (this remained controversial after the near-release of former Calauan, Laguna mayor Antonio Sanchez, the mastermind in the June 1993 rape-slay of UPLB college student Mary Eileen Sarmenta and killing of her companion Allan Gomez)
Republic Act No. 10951, updated the values of damages in certain crimes, and the value of fines

See also 

 Philippine legal codes
 List of Philippine laws

References

External links 

 Act No. 3815
 Act No. 3815, December 08, 1930
 Republic Act No. 10951
 REPUBLIC ACT NO. 10951, August 29, 2017

Philippines
Philippine criminal law
1930 in law